Sándor Rózsa (born July 10, 1813, Röszke – died November 22, 1878, Szamosújvár) was a Hungarian outlaw (in Hungarian: betyár) from the Great Hungarian Plain. He is the best-known Hungarian highwayman; his life inspired numerous writers, notably Zsigmond Móricz and Gyula Krúdy.  He enjoyed much the same esteem as English highwayman Dick Turpin, with elements of Robin Hood thrown in for good measure.  Rózsa, like Jóska Sobri, is one of the most famous Hungarian betyárs (bandits).

Biography 
It was at the age of 23 (1836) when he first was sent to jail in Szeged. After escaping he chose the life of a highwayman and a number of bloody and infamous acts made his name well-known.

In October 1848 on behalf of the Committee of Defence (Honvédelmi Bizottmány), he joined the Hungarian Revolution of 1848 with his company of 150. With their strange appearance and method of fighting they had success but because of their lack of discipline they were disbanded.

After the fall of the revolution he was forced to flee and returned to his earlier brigand lifestyle. He was not captured until 1857, when he was betrayed by one of his companions. He was sentenced to life imprisonment. He spent 9 years in prisons at Kufstein, Szabadka and Pétervárad till he was released in a general amnesty in 1868.

In the same year he resumed his old pursuits and robbed post coaches and railway trains. He was again captured on January 12, 1869 and was again sentenced to imprisonment for life.

He died in prison in Szamosújvár.

Sándor Rózsa is also discussed in the book  (Terrible Robbers of the Bieszczady and Surrounding Areas) by Polish author Robert Bankosz.

His favourite hiding places were the islets on Ludas Lake (now Ludaš Lake, Serbia).

Popular culture
In the Czechoslovakian television series  (1985), Sándor Rózsa is played by Czech actor Pavel Zedníček.

In 2018, the Hungarian Two-tailed Dog Party has named its "State Fund Wasting Public Program" after him.

References

External links 
 Article about Rózsa Sándor in The New York Times published on December 15, 1878

Hungarian outlaws
1813 births
1878 deaths
Hungarian Revolution of 1848
Inmates of Gherla prison
People from Csongrád-Csanád County
Hungarian folklore